State Road 160 in the U.S. State of Indiana is a narrow two-lane road that crosses the scenic hill country of Washington, Scott and Clark counties.

Route description
The western terminus of State Road 160 is in Salem at its parent route, State Road 60.  It passes to the south of the Clark State Forest just before reaching Henryville, where it intersects with Interstate 65 (Exit 19) and U.S. Route 31.

History 
SR 160 from Charlestown to Henryville was number State Road 39. In September 2012, INDOT gave the section of roadway from US 31 to SR 403 to Clark County.

Major intersections

References

External links

160
Transportation in Clark County, Indiana
Transportation in Washington County, Indiana
Transportation in Scott County, Indiana